The PWA Tag Team Championship was a professional wrestling tag team championship in Pro Wrestling America (PWA). It remained active until 1996 when PWA began running occasional events.

The inaugural champions were The Terminators (Riggs and Wolf), who defeated The Warlord and Teijo Khan in Anoka, Minnesota on January 15, 1985 to become the first PWA Tag Team Champions. At 609 days, The Terminators' second reign was the longest while the team's third and final reign was the shortest lasting only 2 days. With three reigns, The Terminators also held the most reigns as a tag team and individually. Overall, there were 19 reigns.

Title history
Key

Reigns

List of combined reigns

Footnotes

References
General

Specific

External links
PWA Tag Team Title at Cagewrestling.de

Tag team wrestling championships